Shandong Experimental High School, (abbreviation:SEHS) is a provincial key high school, the first experimental high school, founded on October 10, 1948, in Shandong Province. Since its foundation it has carried out research on educational systems, curricula, teaching methodology, and educational administration. It has been ranked No.1 in Shandong Province and No. 14 nationally. Its students have won 16 gold medals, eight silver medals and three bronze medals in International Olympiads in math, physics, chemistry, and informatics etc. Now, the president of school is Kuiming Fang.

Basics 
Shandong Experimental Senior High School is one of the key provincial senior high schools and the first batch of standardized schools of Shandong Province.  It was founded in October 1948 and now has four campuses, covering an area of 226 Chinese acres with a building area of more than 110,000 square meters.  The school has more than 5,600 students and a staff of over 520. It possesses teaching buildings, laboratory buildings, office buildings, libraries, a stadium, an art building, an auditorium, dining halls and an athletic ground.

The school has one expert who receives an allowance from the State Council, two middle-aged and young experts who have contributed prominently to Shandong province, ten "teachers of special grade," six nationwide "excellent teachers," two famous teachers within Shandong province, eleven provincial teaching master-hands, nine municipal outstanding teachers, five well-known teachers in Jinan, and six teachers who have won first or second prize in the national high-quality class teaching competition, as well as over 40 teachers who have won first prize in the provincial high-quality competition. During the selection of “Ten Educational innovation figures”, Shandong Experimental Senior High School is the only one in Shandong province to win all the three of headmaster, head teacher and teacher.

Shandong Experimental Senior High School educates its students in Chinese culture through activities such as bringing cross talk and Beijing Opera to the school, popularizing shadow boxing (taiji boxing), and organizing Beijing Opera get-togethers. It has more than 30 associations and has expanded the students’ international view through international exchange activities. The school has organized study tours all over the world and encourages the students to carry out public service work. The school's students have won sixteen gold medals, eight silver medals and three bronze medals in international course Olympiads and other sports and art competitions.

The school has been awarded advanced collective of the national educational system, the national green school, national school with traditional physical education events, provincial civilized unit, advanced primary Party organization of Shandong province, advanced unit of teachers’ morality construction in Shandong Province, advanced unit of popularizing the knowledge of law in Shandong educational system, and sample school of management in accordance with law in Shandong Province.

Teaching
The school encourages students to take part in competitions, such as International Olympic competitions in physics, chemistry, mathematics, and biology as well as sports and games. Most of the students gain entry to universities, and many students gain entry to Chinese top universities every year. In 2000, experimental classes were set up with the purpose of enhancing high-level personal teaching of the most able students. There are now 10 experimental classes. Since 2001, special classes for the artistically talented have been incorporated into the syllabus. In 2001, eligibility for enrollment into the school was extended from citywide to province-wide.

The school has exchange visits with high schools in America, Britain, France, Japan, Australia, Hungary, Korea, Singapore, and Germany.

Timeline 

 On October 10, 1948, the Ministry of Education and Education approved the establishment of the Jinan Special Municipal Second High School, which was formed by the merger of the former Jinan No. 1 and No. 2 Provincial High School.
 On October 18, 1948, Jinan Special Municipal Second Middle School (the predecessor of Shandong Provincial Experimental High School) officially opened for classes. The school is located at Xiaowei 4th Road, Jingliu Road. 
 In November 1948, the former East China University (the predecessor of Shandong University) moved to Jinan, and the school became the High School Affiliated to East China University.
 In November 1949, the former School of Education of East China University was designated as Shandong Normal University, and the affiliated middle school was handed over to the leaders of Jinan City, and was renamed Shandong Provincial Experimental High School. 
 1950-1956, "New China learns from the Soviet Union and takes the Soviet road". Since the school is the first experimental middle school in the country that uses new teaching materials and new methods, it is officially named "Shandong Experimental High School".
 In 1960, the school exchanged with the original No. 3 Middle School and moved to the current location, and later the No. 3 Middle School moved to Tai'an.
 From 1966 to 1976, due to the influence of Cultural Revolution, the Experimental Highschool was repudiated as "cultivating the seedlings of the bourgeoisie", so it was renamed "Jinan No. 22 High School".
 In 1976, the name of the school was restored as Shandong Experimental High School. 
 In 2013, the West School (Jinan Xicheng Experimental High School) was established.
 In 2018, Jinan University Town Experimental Senior High School was incorporated into the Education Group.
 In 2019, Jinan Experimental Foreign Language School was incorporated into the Education Group and began to recruit students.
 In 2022, strict regulations targeting students in the school were implemented by the new president, Kuiming Fang.

Campuses

Main campus 
It is situated on Jingshi Road in downtown Jinan. It's the oldest campus of the four campuses. It has 1-5# teaching buildings, a school library, a laboratory building, a gym and international department building; two basketball courts and a playground. The oldest using building is 1# teaching building, it's now used as an office for the important departments of school. The newest building is 5# teaching building, it has been used since September 2018. There are two gardens in the school, the eastern one called Qin Garden, the western has a Ascension Cup, names of the students who got international prize. Student have to go home every night for the little land.

Eastern campus 
Eastern campus is in Guodian Third Block. There are 105 classes, and 502 teachers and staff in the school. Among the teaching staff are five special-class teachers, 144 senior teachers, 10 with master's degrees, 10 with M.Ed. certification, and 149 who have undertaken postgraduate courses. The school is equipped with playgrounds, gardens (including a zoology garden) and buildings for teaching, offices, a library, performance and display art, gyms, apartments, halls, and cafes.

Other campuses 
Western one is on Dezhou Road; Changqing campus is on Wate Road.

Presidents 

 Wang Datong 王大彤 1948.10-1951.9
 Ninghange 寧漢戈 1951.9-1954.4
 Han Yang 韓陽 1954.4-1959.3
 Wang Ming 王明 1957.8-1960.8
 Bi Kexin 1959.3-1960.5
 Du Lizhou 杜黎州 1960.8-1968.10
 Cui Weilin 崔惟琳 1975.6-1981.10
 Li Yong 李墉 1979.5-1980.12
 Li Li 李力 1980.12-1986.12
 Han Chang 韓常 1986.12-1999
 Liu Kun 劉堃 1999-2010
 Wang Pinmu 王品木 2010-2016
 Han Xianghe 韓相河 2016-2022
 Fang Kuiming 方奎明 2022-present

Notable alumni 

 Li Guoan, deputy to the 11th National People's Congress, researcher of the Institute of New Materials of Shandong Academy of Sciences, former deputy to the 10th National People's Congress, member of the Standing Committee of the 8th Provincial Committee of the Chinese People's Political Consultative Conference, class of 1960
 Cong Rigang Deputy Director of the Military Science and Technology Committee of the General Armament Department, Lieutenant General, class of 1965
 Yin Li Deputy Director of the National Health and Family Planning Commission, Deputy Director of the State Food and Drug Administration, Deputy Secretary of the Party Group, class of 1977
 Zhang Lu Deputy Director of the English Division of the Translation Office of the Ministry of Foreign Affairs, Chief Translator of Hu Jintao and Wen Jiabao, class of 1996
 Zhang Yueran, young writer, class of 2001

Sister Schools 

 Holbein-Gymnasium, Augsburg, Germany
 Naga Senior High School, Iwade, Japan
 Daeyoung High School,  Seoul , South Korea
 Chung-Hsin High School, Hsinchu, Taiwan
 Housatonic Valley Regional High School, Falls Village, Connecticut, United States

References

External links
Official website en (English version)
Official website zh(Chinese version & main campus)
Eastern campus (Chinese version)
Western campus (Chinese version)
Changqing campus (Chinese version)

Schools in China
Schools in Shandong
Educational institutions established in 1948
1948 establishments in China